Lee Cheuk Yiu (born 28 August 1996) is a Hong Kong badminton player.

Career 
Lee reached the final of the 2019 Hong Kong Open, after quarter- and semi-final wins against former world champion Viktor Axelsen and former world number one Srikanth Kidambi respectively. He eventually won against Anthony Sinisuka Ginting and secured his first title in a BWF World Tour tournament.

Achievements

Asian Youth Games 
Boys' singles

Asian Junior Championships 
Boys' singles

BWF World Tour (1 title) 
The BWF World Tour, which was announced on 19 March 2017 and implemented in 2018, is a series of elite badminton tournaments sanctioned by the Badminton World Federation (BWF). The BWF World Tour is divided into levels of World Tour Finals, Super 1000, Super 750, Super 500, Super 300 (part of the HSBC World Tour), and the BWF Tour Super 100.

Men's singles

BWF Grand Prix (1 title) 
The BWF Grand Prix had two levels, the Grand Prix and Grand Prix Gold. It was a series of badminton tournaments sanctioned by the Badminton World Federation (BWF) and played between 2007 and 2017.

Men's singles

  BWF Grand Prix Gold tournament
  BWF Grand Prix tournament

BWF International Challenge/Series (4 runners-up) 
Men's singles

  BWF International Challenge tournament
  BWF International Series tournament
  BWF Future Series tournament

References

External links 
 

1996 births
Living people
Hong Kong male badminton players
Badminton players at the 2014 Summer Youth Olympics
Badminton players at the 2018 Asian Games
Asian Games competitors for Hong Kong